The Bahamas Speed Week was an annual motor racing meeting held at Nassau in The Bahamas from 1954 to 1966.

History
First held in 1954 on the Windsor Field Road Course in Nassau, the inaugural event was titled as the Nassau Trophy Road Races. Masten Gregory won the main race, the Nassau Trophy, in a Ferrari 375 MM. The 1956 meeting was promoted as the Third Annual International Bahamas Speed Week. For 1957, the meeting was moved to another airfield location, the  anti-clockwise Oakes Field Course, which was closer to the main population areas on the island.

Due to needed track repairs and the lack of additional funding by the Bahamian government, as well as competition from more races running in December, the event was discontinued after the 1966 edition.

The success of the Bahamas Speed Week led to the creation of other events in the Caribbean, like the Cuban Grand Prix and the Puerto Rico Grand Prix.

Nassau Trophy

The following table lists the winners of the Nassau Trophy, the feature race at each of the 13 Speed Week meetings.

Bahamas Speed Week Revival

Since 2011 the Bahamas Speed Week Revival has taken place along the beach at Nassau and down from the harbor. Cars range from vintage racers to new vehicles that now race in a time trials format.

References

External links

Historic motorsport events
Nassau, Bahamas
Motor racing competitions